Dubyonki is a rural locality (a village) in Muromtsevskoye Rural Settlement, Sudogodsky District, Vladimir Oblast, Russia. The population was 19 as of 2010.

Geography 
Dubyonki is located on the Dubyonka River, 15 km southwest of Sudogda (the district's administrative centre) by road. Klavdino is the nearest rural locality.

References 

Rural localities in Sudogodsky District